Elvy Olsson (1923-2022) was a Swedish politician of the Centre Party. 

She was MP of the Parliament of Sweden in 1964–1980. 

She served as Minister for Housing in 1976–1979. 

She served as County Governor of Örebro County in 1980-1989.

References

1923 births
2022 deaths
20th-century Swedish politicians
20th-century Swedish women politicians
Women members of the Riksdag
Women government ministers of Sweden
Swedish Ministers for Housing
Governors of Örebro County